Petropavlovka is a rural locality (a village) in Kalmiyarovsky Selsoviet, Tatyshlinsky District, Bashkortostan, Russia. The population was 291 as of 2010. There are 5 streets.

Geography 
Petropavlovka is located 22 km southeast of Verkhniye Tatyshly (the district's administrative centre) by road. Starokalmiyarovo is the nearest rural locality.

References 

Rural localities in Tatyshlinsky District